"Ain't No Good" is a song by Swedish singer Mimi Werner. The song was released in Sweden as a digital download on 6 February 2016, and was written by Werner along with Göran Werner, Marcus Svedin, and Jason Saenz. It took part in Melodifestivalen 2016, and placed fifth in the first semi-final.

Track listing

Chart performance

Weekly charts

Release history

References

2015 songs
2016 singles
Melodifestivalen songs of 2016
Mimi Werner songs
Swedish pop songs
English-language Swedish songs